"Good Times" is a song recorded by Eric Burdon & the Animals and released on the 1967 album Winds of Change, with music and lyrics by Eric Burdon, John Weider, Vic Briggs, Danny McCulloch and Barry Jenkins.

The lyrics tell the story of someone who regrets having wasted too much time doing useless things instead of aspiring to become someone successful. Musically, the song has a dark and depressed feeling with a light-hearted break just before the final verse.

The song features a string quartet, which is heard in the second portion of the song.

The single reached number 20 on the UK Singles Chart. It was the B-side to "San Franciscan Nights" in the U.S. The B-side "Ain't that So" was included as part of the soundtrack to the film Stranger in the House (1967). Every band member, except Burdon, appeared at the premiere.

In 1987 it was released as a single again, while it was the soundtrack to the movie Die Katze starring Götz George. This version reached #53 in Germany.

Ozzy Osbourne covered the song for his album Under Cover, 2005.

It was also featured on Burdon's live album The Official Live Bootleg #2 (2000) by Eric Burdon's I band.

Most recently, it was featured in the 2017 film Small Town Crime.

1967 singles
Songs written by Eric Burdon
The Animals songs
Ozzy Osbourne songs
Song recordings produced by Tom Wilson (record producer)
MGM Records singles
1967 songs